Nüziders is a municipality in the district of Bludenz in the Austrian state of Vorarlberg.  It was capital of the historical County of Sonnenberg which is referred to in the formal style of the Emperor of Austria.

Population

References

Cities and towns in Bludenz District